Gerald Penn may refer to:
Gerald Penn (computer scientist)
Gerald Penn (immunologist)